Shackles is a 2005 film directed by Charles Winkler and written by Donald Martin. It stars D.L. Hughley and Jose Pablo Cantillo. The poems featured in the film were written by Jerry Quickley.

Cast
D.L. Hughley as Ben Cross
Jose Pablo Cantillo as Gabriel Garcia
Jerry Quickley as Tone
Mark Berry as Rasheed
Daniel Louis Rivas as Pretty
Barry Shabaka Henley as Virgil
Georg Stanford Brown as Warden
Kristen Wilson as Helen
Pablo Santos as Minnow
Vicellous Reon Shannon as Sammy One
Paul Vincent O'Connor as Captain O'Leary
Genoveze as El Perro

References

External links

2005 films
American drama films
2005 drama films
2000s English-language films
Films directed by Charles Winkler
2000s American films